St Oswald's Church is an active Roman Catholic church in the Padgate suburb of Warrington, Cheshire, England. The parish was founded by Benedictine monks from Ampleforth Abbey, it is now served by clergy from the Roman Catholic Archdiocese of Liverpool.

History

The parish was established from St Mary's Church, Warrington by Fr. Thomas Austin Hind O.S.B, a Warringtonian by birth, who is credited with conceiving the idea to build the church and to have chosen the dedication to St Oswald of Northumbria. On 1 July 1924, Archbishop Keating of Liverpool give permission for the formation of this, the fourth Benedictine parish in Warrington: the others being St. Albans (1755); St.Mary's (1877) and St. Benedict's (1902). The parish was served by the clergy of St Mary's Church, Warrington until it became an independent parish on 24 July 1929.

The last Benedictine Parish Priest was Fr Harold Cyprian Broomfield O.S.B as the Abbot of Ampleforth Abbey surrendered the parish to the Archbishop of Liverpool on 10 September 1962
From 2013, following the death of Canon William Redmond, the parish was served by the parish priest of St Benedict's Church, Warrington. On 1 May 2018, St.Oswald's became part of one new combined parish called Blessed James Bell which also incorporates the former parishes of St Mary's and St Benedict's in Warrington.

Parish Priests

School and Convent

In 1929 the Sisters of the Cross and Passion, part of the Passionist family, moved from Buttermarket Street in Warrington to Bruche Hall close to the church. A school, with a capacity for 200 children, was opened on 1 September 1931 which was staffed by the sisters and lay teachers. In 1971 a purpose built Convent was built and the old house demolished.

Gallery

References

External links
 

Roman Catholic churches in Cheshire
Roman Catholic churches in Warrington
Warrington
Roman Catholic churches completed in 1965
Christian organizations established in 1924
20th-century Roman Catholic church buildings in the United Kingdom